Jim Lynch (born 1943) is an Irish retired hurler who played as a full-back and as a full-forward for the Kilkenny senior team.

Lynch made his first appearance for the team during the 1964 championship and became a regular player over the next few years. During that time he won one All-Ireland winner's medal, three Leinster winner's medals and one National League winners' medal.

At club level, Lynch enjoyed a successful career with Mooncoin, winning a county club championship winners' medals in 1965.

Career statistics

References

Teams

1943 births
Living people
Mooncoin hurlers
Kilkenny inter-county hurlers
Leinster inter-provincial hurlers
All-Ireland Senior Hurling Championship winners